James McClintock may refer to:

 James B. McClintock, American professor of biology
 James H. McClintock (1864–1934), American historian and volunteer cavalry officer in Roosevelt's Rough Riders